opened in Utsunomiya, Tochigi Prefecture, Japan, in 1972. The collection includes works by Hamada Shōji, Takahashi Yuichi, Constable, Corot, Gainsborough, Monet, and Turner, and special exhibitions are also mounted.

See also
 Tochigi Prefectural Museum
 Utsunomiya Museum of Art

References

External links

 Tochigi Prefectural Museum of Fine Arts

Museums in Tochigi Prefecture
Art museums and galleries in Japan
Utsunomiya
Art museums established in 1972
1972 establishments in Japan